Carlos Monges Caldera (14 March 1926 – 2 February 1988) was a Mexican sprinter. He competed in the men's 400 metres at the 1948 Summer Olympics.

References

External links
 

1926 births
1988 deaths
Athletes (track and field) at the 1948 Summer Olympics
Athletes (track and field) at the 1951 Pan American Games
Mexican male sprinters
Olympic athletes of Mexico
Athletes from Mexico City
Central American and Caribbean Games medalists in athletics
Pan American Games competitors for Mexico
20th-century Mexican people